John I of Opava (also known as John of Fulnek, ;  – 1454) was a member of the Opava branch of the Bohemian Přemyslid dynasty.  He was co-ruler of Opava and Głubczyce from his father's death (between 1445 and 1447) and his own death.  He was also Lord of Fulnek.

Life 
His parents were Duke Wenceslaus II of Opava and Głubczyce and Elisabeth of Kravař.

After his father's death (between 1445 and 1447) John I and his younger brother John II "the Pious" jointly inherited the Duchy of Głubczyce and one third of the Duchy of Opava.

John I died unmarried and childless in 1454.  His brother inherited his possessions.

References 
 Ludwig Petry et al.: Geschichte Schlesiens, vol. 1, Sigmaringen, 1988, p. 191 and 212

External links

Footnotes 

Medieval Bohemian nobility
Opavian Přemyslids
1420 births
1454 deaths
15th-century Bohemian people